Breman Asikuma is a town in the Central Region, Ghana. The town is known for the Breman Asikuma Senior High School.  The school is a second cycle institution.

References

Populated places in the Central Region (Ghana)